The Thailand VS Challenger (TVC) Series is a Bangkok-based muaythai promotion which was officially launched on 16 January 2010. Now widely recognized as the biggest muaythai event series in Asia, the Middle East and Europe, TVC is produced and promoted by Elite Boxing (EB), headed by Promoter, Toli Makris, and Co-Founder, Seth Fishman DVM.

The Thailand VS Challenger (TVC) Series Concept
Thailand VS Challenger (TVC) was developed to meet the growing demands of muaythai and combat sports fans across the globe for a premium stand-up fighting event series.

The concept of TVC is to have an elite Thai national team taking on the best muaythai fighters from around the world in a series of regional challenges. TVC events combine the raw energy and passion of muaythai with high-quality entertainment at luxury venues around the world.

TVC History
Before TVC entered the market, the sport of muaythai was largely undeveloped. In Thailand, muaythai catered primarily to working class Thais with events held in run-down old stadiums. Although muaythai had some international appeal, the lack of an internationally recognized brand prevented the sport from reaching its global potential.

Since its launch in January 2010, TVC has gone a long way towards achieving its number one objective of becoming the world's number one muaythai brand by offering fight fans a superior entertainment experience in a safe and comfortable environment.

Playing on national pride and adding a higher level of commercialization to the sport, TVC has been able to expand the reach of muaythai by attracting a new generation of fans as well as tapping into the huge global market of combat sports fans.

Following an extravagant Grand Opening to the inaugural TVC Series at Siam Paragon in Bangkok in January 2010, a number of successful TVC events have been held in Thailand, Malaysia, Germany and U.A.E.

Television Broadcast
Each TVC event is televised worldwide through a network of broadcast partners. TVC events are broadcast across Asia by ESPN/Star Sports as part of a 5-year agreement. Eurosport broadcasts TVC events in Europe.

For domestic broadcasts, TVC also collaborates with local television stations. Since 2012, TVC has also been working with Astro Malaysia, while TRUE Sports cover TVC events in Thailand.

Elite Boxing is currently negotiating with additional broadcasters with the aim of expanding its global reach to include 180 countries by 2014.

Events

Fighters

Thai Team
 1.  Changpuek Sor.KeawSuek
 2.  Kaoklai Kaennorsing
 3.  Saiyok Pumpanmuang
 4.  Nonsai Sor. Sanyakorn
 5.  Armin Pumpanmuang Windy Sport
 6.  Mardsua Lamai Gym

Challengers
 1.  Dzhabar Askerov
 2.  Marco Piqué
 3.  Bruce Macfie
 4.  Antuan Siangboxing
 5.  Alex Vogel
 6.  Cyrus Washington

External links
CNN: Muay Thai gets an infusion of Vegas-style glamour
Bangkok Post: Elite event
Bangkok Post: Fighting for friendship
Pattaya Mail: Thailand off to a flying start in muaythai Challenger Series
Fox Sports: Thailand versus The World
TVC on Fight Club Eurosport: Featured events
World Muaythai Council: Thailand Vs. Challenger – Press Conference
World Muaythai Council: Thailand vs Challenger – Results
World Muaythai Council: Thailand Vs. Challenger 2011
World Muaythai Council: Thailand vs Europe 2011
World Muaythai Council: Thailand VS Challenger: Germany
World Muaythai Council: HONOURS EVENT FOR THAIS AND GERMANS
World Muaythai Council: 150 Years – Germany and Thailand: History is Always In the Making
World Muaythai Council: Thailand VS Germany
World Muaythai Council: Thailand vs Asia
World Muaythai: Thailand vs. Asia’s Roaring Success!
IFMA: Thailand vs Europe
IFMA: 150 Years – Germany and Thailand: History is Always In the Making
IFMA: Thailand vs. Asia’s Roaring Success!
IFMA:Thailand vs Asia
Ground and Pound: Exklusiv Interview mit Toli Makris
Ground and Pound: Thailand vs Germany 2-2
Ground and Pound: Thailand vs Challenger Series: Offizielles Wiegen
Ground and Pound: Thailand vs Germany in Ulm
Ground and Pound: Thailand vs. Germany 2012
Ground and Pound: Update: Thailand vs Germany
Ground and Pound: Thailand vs Europa 3-1
Ground And Pound: Thailand vs Challenger Series
Luxury Club Thailand: Toli Makris
Lifestyle Asia: Toli Makris
The Star: Malaysia set to play host for international Muay Thai battle
The Star: Muaythai exponent Mohd Ali ready to fight anyone
The Malay Mail: Two Malaysians in Thailand vs Asia boxing event here on Oct 9 
MSN: Diana Danielle and Fay Hokulani host Elite Boxing’s Thailand Vs. Asia
Expatriate Lifestyle: Thailand VS Challenger in KL
Demotix: Thailand VS Challenger Series
Fight Sport Asia: Elite-Boxing Event in Malaysia: “Thailand vs. Asia”
Fightmag.net: Thailand vs Challenger
The science of 8 limbs: Thailand Versus Germany – Thailand Vs. Challenger
Asia Travel Tips: Thailand vs. Challenger TV to Hold Opening Event in Bangkok
Muaythaitv: Thailand vs Challenger
Muaythaitv: Thailand vs Germany Results
Muaythaitv: Thaïland vs. Middle East results
Muaythaitv: Thaïland vs. Germany - Results Coming soon : Thaïland vs. Middle East - Thursday 25 November
Muaythaitv: Thaïland vs. Germany Sunday, November 14th
Thaizeit: "THAILAND VS. CHALLENGER": THAIBOXEN AUF TOP-NIVEAU IN BANGKOK
 E Travel Blackboard: Thailand Vs Challenger Offered a Stunning Night of World Class Muaythai Entertainment
Muay Thai is Life: Thailand vs. Germany: Into the Heart of Europe
Thailand Holiday Homes: Thailand's Muay Thai Elite Take On the World
Naked Farang: THAILAND Vs THE WORLD
World Combat News: Results – Elite Boxing: Thailand VS Challenger (Jan.16.2010)
Newswit: Thailand vs. Challenger TV to hold opening event in Bangkok in January 2010
CleverMunkey: Thailand vs Asia (The Best of Malaysia) Press Conference
Chelsea Chil: Muaythai - Thailand vs Asia (The BEST of Malaysia)
Aston Morgon Blog: Thailand vs Challenger Grand Opening coming up
Cat & Nat: Thailand vs Challenger After Party on Grand Pearl Cruise
Thai Tickets Major: ELITE BOXING-THAILAND VS CHALLENGER SERIES
 Air Asia Red Tix: Thailand VS Asia

Boxing competitions
Kickboxing in Thailand